"Long Black Veil" is a 1959 country ballad, written by Danny Dill and Marijohn Wilkin and originally recorded by Lefty Frizzell.

It is told from the point of view of a man falsely accused of murder and executed. He refuses to provide an alibi, since on the night of the murder he was having an extramarital affair with his best friend's wife, and would rather die and take their secret to his grave than admit the truth. The chorus describes the woman's mourning visits to his gravesite, wearing a long black veil and enduring a wailing wind.

In 2019, Frizzell's version of "Long Black Veil" was selected by the Library of Congress for preservation in the National Recording Registry for being "culturally, historically, or aesthetically significant".

Background
The writers later stated that they drew on three sources for their inspiration: Red Foley's recording of "God Walks these Hills with Me", a contemporary newspaper report about the unsolved murder of a priest, and the legend of a mysterious veiled woman who regularly visited Rudolph Valentino's grave. Dill himself called it an "instant folksong".

Wilkin played piano on the original recording by Frizzell. The song was a departure from Frizzell's previous honky tonk style and was a deliberate move toward the then current popularity of folk-styled material and the burgeoning Nashville sound.

Success
Recorded in Nashville in 1959 by Lefty Frizzell and produced by Don Law, the single reached #6 on Billboard Hot C&W Sides chart. In the process, the song became Frizzell's best-performing single in five years.

Cover versions
"Long Black Veil" has become a standard and has been covered by a variety of artists in country, folk and rock styles. The highest charting cover version was a #26 country hit by Sammi Smith in 1974.

Johnny Cash performed the song on the first episode of The Johnny Cash Show in 1969, duetting with Joni Mitchell. The song has also appeared on landmark albums by Johnny Cash and The Band in 1968 (see list below), and charted again in 1999 with the Dave Matthews Band, who performed the song live with Emmylou Harris at a Johnny Cash tribute concert. Early in her career, Joan Baez incorporated the song into her live repertoire, and recorded it twice (see list below).

The Band performed the song at the 1969 Woodstock Festival, and it appears on their first studio album, Music From Big Pink.

The song appears on David Allan Coe's 1984 compilation 20 Greatest Hits and on Marianne Faithfull's Rich Kid Blues, recorded in 1971 but shelved until 1985.

Nick Cave and the Bad Seeds recorded a version for the 1986 covers album Kicking Against the Pricks.

The song was performed by Bruce Springsteen on his 2006 Seeger Sessions Band Tour. 

The chorus is frequently sung by Bruce Hornsby during live performances of his song "White Wheeled Limousine", including the version on the retrospective box set Intersections (1985-2005).

Mick Jagger recorded a version with The Chieftains for that group's 1995 album The Long Black Veil.

Mike Ness, principal songwriter and guitarist of punk-rock band Social Distortion, covered the song on his 1999 debut solo album Cheating at Solitaire.

Jerry Garcia, David Grisman and Tony Rice cover the song on the 2000 Pizza Tapes recordings.

It has been covered by Harry Manx, including a version on the compilation Johnny's Blues: A Tribute to Johnny Cash, and in October 2009, by Rosanne Cash on her album The List. A version by Scottish rock band Nazareth was never released on an album, but is played at live concerts.

On the 2011 album Rancho Alto by Jason Boland & the Stragglers, the song "False Accuser's Lament" is a follow up to "Long Black Veil", describing a witness's view of the events and the role that he played.

Phil Lesh of the Grateful Dead performed the song several times, with a variety of musicians, in his rotating line-ups of Phil Lesh and Friends at his venue Terrapin Crossroads. Jamey Johnson has covered the song on tour. Black Rebel Motorcycle Club occasionally perform the song during their live shows. The Black Crowes have covered the song, for instance during their December 17, 2010 performance at The Fillmore in San Francisco.

Richard Hawley covered the song as a B-side to "Just Like the Rain".

The Proclaimers' version is included as a bonus track on the 2001 release of their 1988 album Sunshine on Leith.

Hit singles
1959 Lefty Frizzell, US Country single #6
1974 Sammi Smith, US Country single #26

Tracks on hit albums
1962 The Kingston Trio, New Frontier - US Pop album #16
1962 Burl Ives, The Versatile Burl Ives! - US Pop album #35
1963 Joan Baez, Joan Baez in Concert, Part 2 - US Pop album #7, UK album #15
1965 Johnny Cash, Orange Blossom Special - US Pop album #49
1968 Johnny Cash, Johnny Cash at Folsom Prison - US Pop album #13, US Country album #1, UK album #8
1968 The Band, Music from Big Pink - US Pop album #30
1970 Joan Baez, One Day at a Time - US Pop album #80
1972 New Riders of the Purple Sage, Gypsy Cowboy - US Pop album #85
1983 John Anderson, Wild & Blue - US Pop album #58, US Country Albums #3
1995 The Chieftains with Mick Jagger (vocal), The Long Black Veil - US Pop album #22, UK album #17
1999 Mike Ness, Cheating at Solitaire - US Pop album #80
1999 Dave Matthews Band, Listener Supported - US Pop album #15
2015 Robert Earl Keen, Jr., Happy Prisoner: The Bluegrass Sessions - US Pop album #109, US Top Bluegrass Albums 1, US Country Albums #10, US Top Top Independent Albums #6

Other versions

1960 Carl Mann, included on the 1997 compilation Rockin' Mann
1960 The Country Gentlemen, Country Songs, Old and New
1961 Burl Ives, The Versatile Burl Ives
1962 Johnny Rivers
1963 The Country Gentlemen, On The Road (live album)
1964 Jerry & Sara, Live at The Tangent, Palo Alto, CA, Jerry Garcia and his first wife Sara
1964 Johnny Williams and The Jokers
1968 The Move, The BBC Sessions
1968 The Wolfe Tones, The Rights of Man
1969 The Byrds, Live in Boston 1969, unofficial release
1969 The Small Faces, bootleg album, recorded live in Vienna, Austria, on 12 January 1969.
1970 Bill Monroe and his Blue Grass Boys, Kentucky Bluegrass
1971 Hank Williams, Jr., Sweet Dreams
1971 Marianne Faithfull, Rich Kid Blues, released in 1985
1980 Jimmy "Orion" Ellis, Country
1983 Zelenáči (Greenhorns) as "Dlouhý černý závoj" (lyrics by :cs:Jan Vyčítal) on "Pod Liščí skálou"
1985 Baby Opaque, featuring Ian Mackaye, Fugue In Cow Minor
1986 Nick Cave and the Bad Seeds, Kicking Against the Pricks
1988 The Proclaimers, King of the Road EP
1989 The Walkabouts, Cataract (Walkabouts album)
1992 Michael Nesmith, Live At The Lone Star Roadhouse, bootleg recording
1993 Jerry Garcia, David Grisman, Tony Rice, The Pizza Tapes - released in 1999
1995 Don Walser, The Archive Series Volume 2
1995 Don Williams, Borrowed Tales
1997 Sally Timms, Cowboy Sally
2002 Daryle Singletary, That's Why I Sing This Way
2002 Jason & the Scorchers, Wildfires + Misfires
2002 Bastard Sons of Johnny Cash, Distance Between
2002 Dave Matthews Band, The Gorge (6-Disc Special Edition).
2003 Johnny Cash, opening track on Unearthed box set released just after his death
2003 Deadstring Brothers, Deadstring Brothers
2003 Jon Langford and The Pine Valley Cosmanauts, The Executioner's Last Songs: Volume 3
2003 Rob Coffinshaker, "Fairytales from the Dungeon" single
2003 Harry Manx, Johnny's Blues: A Tribute To Johnny Cash (compilation tribute album)
2004 Dave Gunning and Charlie A'Court from Gunning's CD Two-Bit World
2005 Tim O'Brien, Fiddler's Green 
2005 Bruce Hornsby, Intersections (1985-2005) (cameoed in the middle of "White-Wheeled Limousine")
2005 Charming Hostess, Punch 
2006 Crooked Fingers, Like a Version 2, an Australian covers album
2006 Richard Hawley, B-side of "Just Like The Rain"
2007 Stoney LaRue, Live at Billy Bob's Texas
2007 David Gray,"A Thousand Miles Behind" live USA
2007 Chip Taylor & Carrie Rodriguez Live From The Ruhr Triennale
2007 Professor Louis and the Crowmatix (The Spirit of Woodstock)
2007 Matt Andersen, 'Live at Liberty House'
2008 Diamanda Galás, Guilty Guilty Guilty
2009 Aunt Martha, Candymaker Tour NYC
2009 Razzy Bailey, Damned Good Time, (with Johnny Cash)
2009 Rosanne Cash (Feat. Jeff Tweedy)
2009 Caroline Herring, Golden Apples of the Sun
2012 Gregg Allman & The All Star Band, Love for Levon
2012 Iron & Wine
2014 Sarah Jackson (A cappella version)
2014 Carter Hulsey, Drive Out
2014 We Banjo 3, Gather The Good
2016 Dale Watson, Under the Influence
2017 Jenny Owen Youngs, Long Black Veil - Single
2017 Lee Ann Womack, The Lonely, the Lonesome & the Gone
2018 Southbound Pilot, Monterrey Court, Southbound Pilot Live
The Stanley Brothers
Bobby Bare
Chris Ledoux
Banks & Shane
Bob Dylan one 1997 performance available on various bootlegs
Nazareth

References

1959 songs
American folk songs
Burl Ives songs
Joan Baez songs
Johnny Cash songs
Lefty Frizzell songs
Songs written by Danny Dill
Songs written by Marijohn Wilkin
The Band songs
The Kingston Trio songs
Murder ballads
Songs about infidelity
United States National Recording Registry recordings
1950s ballads
Song recordings produced by Don Law